The Care Act 2014 is an Act of the Parliament of the United Kingdom that received royal assent on 14 May 2014, after being introduced on 9 May 2013. The main purpose of the act was to overhaul the existing 60-year-old legislation regarding social care in England. The Care Act 2014 sets out in one place, local authorities’ duties in relation to assessing people's needs and their eligibility for publicly funded care and support.

The Act received the consensus of the three main political parties in the UK during its passage through parliament. The Act was implemented following substantial public consultation but was criticised for some of the funding reforms included within the Act.

The Act was unusual in respect of being one of the few Acts to have started its progress in the House of Lords rather than the House of Commons.

The Care Act is a lengthy act (129 clauses in the main part of the Act) addressing many issues: from a review of the public consultation 107 recommendations were made of which many were adopted. However some of the major changes are: 
That local councils now have a duty to promote the well-being of carers; previously their duty of care was only made to the users of the care services;
That anyone receiving care and support from a regulated provider which has been arranged by the council will be covered by the Human Rights Act 1998;
That councils must enable users or potential users of care services to access independent financial advice on their care funding;
The introduction of a new appeals system for care users to appeal against council decisions on eligibility to care and care funding;
Guidance on safeguarding vulnerable adults, which in England had taken the form of the 2000 No Secrets guidance, was replaced by statutory guidance issued under the legislation.

Financial assessment
Regulations made under the Care Act specify that a permanent resident of a care home is not eligible for local authority financial assistance if they have capital exceeding £23,250 in value. This limit still applies in 2019.

Cap on care costs
Sections 15-16 (not yet implemented) specify that local authorities may not charge more in total for meeting eligible care needs than a specified amount which is to be reviewed annually. Once the cap is reached, any further social care needed by the individual is to be provided free of charge. The cap on care costs was due to be in effect from April 2016, but this was delayed to April 2020, by an announcement by Alistair Burt, the Minister of State for Care and Support, on 17 July 2015. The introduction of the cap had been passed into law as part of the Care Act 2014 during the Coalition government, and implementation of this part of the law from 2016 onwards had been accepted by all main political parties during the general election of 2015.

Changes introduced as a result of Covid-19
In January 2020 the United Kingdom witnessed their first case of COVID-19, a current (as of time of writing) global pandemic which has resulted in millions of worldwide cases and deaths. The illness is a viral respiratory disease and thus is more dangerous for people with underlying health conditions if they catch it compared to a healthy person of the same age, ethnicity and gender. Emergency legislation was created by the government known as the Adult Social Care Action Plan. It has four main goals which aimed to reduce the impact of COVID-19 on the Adult Social Care sector. Section 4.6 and 4.7 of the Adult Social Care Action Plan states how The Coronavirus Act 2020 amends the Care Act 2014. This means that the legal duties outlined in the Care Act 2014 do not have to be fulfilled during the pandemic. Mencap, a leading charity for people with learning disabilities found that 69% of people with learning disabilities who participated in their survey had their care reduced or removed altogether. Through overruling the agreed outcomes through individuals agreed care plans thousands of disabled people are going without their care as a direct result to policy changes.

References

United Kingdom Acts of Parliament 2014
Social care in England